Kıpıklar is a village in the İvrindi district of Balıkesir province in Turkey.

References

Villages in İvrindi District